The Antelomita Hydroelectric Power Station is located in the rural commune Anjeva Gara of the Analamanga Region, Madagascar. The hydroelectric power station comprises two parts, Antelomita I and II. Both are adjacent to one another on separate water falls along the Ikopa River. Each water fall is dammed and water is diverted to the power station; each of which contains three  generators. The first two were commissioned in 1930, the second two in 1952 and the final two in 1953. They were built by a French firm but are now owned and operated by Jirama. The Tsiazompaniry and Mantasoa Dams upstream regulate water to the power station.

It is situated in a distance of 48 km South-East from Antananarivo, 10 km East of Anjeva Gara and 14 km from Ambohimanambola.

References

Energy infrastructure completed in 1930
Energy infrastructure completed in 1953
Dams in Madagascar
Hydroelectric power stations in Madagascar
Analamanga
20th-century architecture in Madagascar